Dominican Church is the name of a number of churches belonging to the Dominicans. Notable examples include:
Dominican Church, Vienna, Austria
Dominican Church, Krems an der Donau, Austria
Dominican Church of the Holy Spirit, Vilnius, Lithuania
Dominican Church, Lviv, Ukraine
Chiesa dei Domenicani, Bolzano, Italy
Church of the Assumption of the Virgin Mary, Košice, Slovakia, commonly known as the Dominican Church.